STS-109 (SM3B) was a Space Shuttle mission that launched from the Kennedy Space Center on 1 March 2002. It was the 108th mission of the Space Shuttle program, the 27th flight of the orbiter Columbia and the fourth servicing of the Hubble Space Telescope. It was also the last successful mission of the orbiter Columbia before the ill-fated STS-107 mission, which culminated in the Columbia disaster.

The Hubble Space Telescope (HST) was placed in orbit during mission STS-31 on 25 April 1990. Initially designed to operate for 15 years, plans for periodic service and refurbishment were incorporated into its mission from the start. After the successful completion of the second planned service mission (SM2) by the crew of STS-82 in February 1997, three of the telescope's six gyroscopes failed. NASA decided to split the third planned service mission into two parts, SM3A and SM3B. A fifth and final servicing mission, STS-125 (SM4) launched on 11 May 2009. The work performed during SM4 kept HST in operation through 2021.

Crew

Spacewalks

Mission highlights

The purpose of STS-109 was to service the Hubble Space Telescope (HST). It was Columbia's first flight following an extensive two and a half year modification period (its most recent mission being STS-93). During the mission the crew installed a new science instrument, the Advanced Camera for Surveys (ACS), new rigid solar arrays (SA3), a new Power Control Unit (PCU) and an experimental cryocooler for the Near Infrared Camera and Multi-Object Spectrometer (NICMOS). Columbia also reboosted HST to a higher orbit.

The STS-109 astronauts performed a total of five spacewalks in five consecutive days to service and upgrade the Hubble Space Telescope. The spacewalkers received assistance from their crewmates inside Columbia. Currie operated the Shuttle's robot arm while Altman was her backup. Carey and Altman documented the EVA activities with video and still images.

Accomplishments of the spacewalks included the installation of new solar arrays, a new camera, a new Power Control Unit, a Reaction Wheel Assembly and an experimental cooling system for the NICMOS unit. STS-109 accumulated a total of 35 hours, 55 minutes of EVA time. Following STS-109, a total of 18 spacewalks had been conducted during four Space Shuttle missions to service Hubble (the others being STS-61, STS-82, STS-103 and STS-125) for a total of 129 hours, 10 minutes by 14 different astronauts.

Columbia made its twenty-seventh and last successful landing at Kennedy Space Center, as on its next mission, STS-107, it disintegrated on re-entry, killing all aboard.

STS-109 is considered a night launch, as sunrise was at 6:47 am, and Columbia launched at 6:22 am EST, 25 minutes before sunrise.

See also

 List of human spaceflights
 List of Space Shuttle missions
 Outline of space science

References

External links

 Status reports – Detailed NASA status reports for each day of the mission.
 NASA mission summary 
 STS-109 reentry pictures
 ESA/Hubble mission summary
 STS-109 Video Highlights 

Space Shuttle missions
Hubble Space Telescope servicing missions
Spacecraft launched in 2002